Home is an American documentary streaming television series produced for Apple TV+. In January 2018, Apple gave the production a series order consisting of a single season of nine episodes. It is produced by three media companies: MediaWeaver, Four M Studios and Altimeter Films, premiered on April 17, 2020. On June 8, 2020, 'Home' was nominated best documentary series, at the Critics' Choice Real TV Awards. In May 2022, the series was renewed for a second season which premiered on June 17, 2022.

Premise
Home guides the audience "inside the world's most extraordinary homes and unveils the boundary-pushing imagination of the visionaries who dared to dream and build them."

Production
Home is executive produced by Joe Poulin, Matthew Weaver, Bruce Gersh, Ian Orefice, Doug Pray, Collin Orcutt, Matt Tyrnauer, Corey Reeser and Kim Rozenfeld. Nick Stern serves as co-executive producer. Matt Tyrnauer directed the series. On May 17, 2022, Apple TV+ renewed the series for a second season which premiered on June 17, 2022.

Episodes

Season 2

References

External links
 – official site

2020s American documentary television series
English-language television shows
2020 American television series debuts
Apple TV+ original programming